Self-Portrait is a 2008 studio album by Swedish artist Jay-Jay Johanson.

Track listing
 "Wonder Wonders" - 5:34
 "Lightning Strikes" - 5:15
 "Autumn Winter Spring" - 4:57
 "Liar" - 0:56
 "Trauma" - 5:26
 "My Mother's Grave" - 2:54
 "Broken Nose" - 5:13
 "Medicine" - 4:42
 "Make Her Mine" - 3:48
 "Sore" 6:07

2008 albums
Jay-Jay Johanson albums